The Devil's Skipper is a 1928 American silent drama film directed by John G. Adolfi and starring Belle Bennett, Montagu Love and Gino Corrado. It was based on a short story by Jack London. It is now considered a lost film.

Cast
 Belle Bennett as The Devil Skipper  
 Montagu Love as First Mate  
 Gino Corrado as Philip La Farge  
 Mary McAllister as Marie La Farge  
 Cullen Landis as John Dubray  
 G. Raymond Nye as Nick the Greek  
 Pat Hartigan as Captain McKenna 
 Adolph Milar as Mate Cornish  
 Carolynne Snowden as Slave  
 Stepin Fetchit as Slave's Husband

References

Bibliography
 Goble, Alan. The Complete Index to Literary Sources in Film. Walter de Gruyter, 1999.

External links

1928 films
1928 drama films
Silent American drama films
Films based on works by Jack London
Films directed by John G. Adolfi
American silent feature films
1920s English-language films
Tiffany Pictures films
Lost American films
American black-and-white films
1928 lost films
Lost drama films
1920s American films